Salas is one of 28 parishes (administrative divisions) in Salas, a municipality within the province and autonomous community of Asturias, in northern Spain.

Salas is on the Camino Primitvo path of the Camino de Santiago.

Villages
Mallecín (Maicín)
Salas
San Martín (Samartín)

References

Parishes in Salas